Les Reports des divers resolutions et judgement donne par les de la Ley en le Temps del Reigne de Hen. VIII., Edw. VI., and Mar. Eliz. Jac. I. et Car. I. is the title of a collection of nominate reports, by Gulielme Bendloe, of cases decided between approximately 1531 and 1628. For the purpose of citation, their name may be abbreviated to "Benl". They are reprinted in volume 73 of the English Reports.

In 1847, J. G. Marvin said:

He also says of "Benloe's or Bendloe's Reports":

References
Les Reports des divers resolutions et judgement donne par les de la Ley en le Temps del Reigne de Hen. VIII., Edw. VI., and Mar. Eliz. Jac. I. et Car. I. folio. London. 1661.

Sets of reports reprinted in the English Reports